People with names Karl von Schönberg:

 Charles Schomberg, 2nd Duke of Schomberg (1645-1693), British General
 Karl von Schönberg (Germany) (1872-1914), German Navy Officer, Commander of the Cruiser "Nürnberg", Killed in the Battle of the Falklands